Tarang Music is a 24-hour music channel owned by Odisha Television Ltd of India. The channel features Odia music from Ollywood and music videos from Odisha. Most of the shows in Tarang Music require call-in audience participation, where the callers speak to a video jockey and request songs that may be dedicated to their loved ones.

List of Programs
All program shows video songs and comedy scenes mostly  from Odia films and Odia Albums.

Break Free
Campus Khati
Choice ra Gita
Dil dosti music
Film Superhit
Kie jite kie hare
Mo gaan ra Swara
Nijhum Ratira Sathi
Sakalu Sakalu Mane Pada
Prem 100 by 100
Top 10
Top 20
What's up Music
Comedy De Danadan
Breakless Music
Gita Gaa-a Tanka Nia
A Day With a Super Star
Music Studio
Kahana E Fula Kahana
Weakend Classic Songs
Public Demand
Radio Time with RJ Ananya
Oolywood Super first
Film Time
Tick Talk

See also
List of Odia-language television channels
List of television stations in India
List of South Asian television channels by country

References

External links
 Tarang Tv Music Channel Updated

Odisha Television Network
Odia-language television channels
Companies based in Bhubaneswar
Music television channels in India
Television channels and stations established in 2009
Television stations in Bhubaneswar
2009 establishments in Orissa